Michael James Radford (born 24 February 1946) is an English film director and screenwriter. He began his career as a documentary director and television comedy writer before transitioning into features in the early 1980s. His best-known credits include the 1984 film adaptation of George Orwell's Nineteen Eighty-Four starring John Hurt and Richard Burton (in his final role), the Shakespeare adaptation The Merchant of Venice, the true crime drama White Mischief, and the 1994 Italian-language comedy drama Il Postino: The Postman, for which he won the BAFTA Awards for Best Direction and Best Film Not in the English Language, and earned Academy Award nominations for Best Director and Best Adapted Screenplay.

Early life and career
Radford was born on 24 February 1946, in New Delhi, India, to a British father and an Austrian Jewish mother. He was educated at Bedford School before attending Worcester College, Oxford. After teaching for a few years, he went to the National Film and Television School, becoming a student there in its inaugural year.

Between 1976 and 1982, Radford worked as a documentary film maker, mostly on projects for the BBC, covering subjects such as Scottish islanders on the Isle of Lewis in the Outer Hebrides who believe in the literal truth of the Bible: The Last Stronghold of the Pure Gospel; the soprano Isobel Buchanan: La Belle Isobel; the singer songwriter Van Morrison: Van Morrison in Ireland; and the self-explanatory The Making of The Pirates of Penzance. On the last two of these Radford worked with the cinematographer Roger Deakins, who would later shoot two of Radford's feature films; Nineteen Eighty-Four and White Mischief. Another notable early work was Another Time, Another Place (1983), a feature film set in Scotland during World War II and centred on a love story between a local woman and an Italian POW.

Career
Radford came to international attention with Nineteen Eighty-Four, his adaptation of George Orwell's novel 1984, starring John Hurt as Winston Smith, and in which Richard Burton gave his final film performance. The film was made in the time and place (London, April–June 1984) at which the book was set.

Radford's next film, released in 1987, was White Mischief, a period drama set in Kenya during the 1940s. Radford again wrote the screenplay, an adaptation of the novel by James Fox also called White Mischief.

Michael Radford is most widely known as the writer and director of the 1994 film Il Postino: The Postman, which Radford adapted from the novel Ardiente Paciencia by Antonio Skármeta. The massive international success of the film (for many years it was the largest grossing non-English language film ever made) led to international acclaim for Radford and the star of the film Massimo Troisi. Tragically Troisi died, aged 41, the day after the filming of Il Postino was completed. The film won many international film awards including the 'Best Film Not in the English Language' BAFTA for Radford, who was also nominated for the Best Director and Adapted Screenplay Academy Awards.

In 2000, Radford's film Dancing at the Blue Iguana was released. In a departure from his more usual development technique, namely adapting novels, this film was largely improvised, although Radford shared the screenwriting credit with David Linter.

In 2004, Radford directed The Merchant of Venice (2004). He adapted the William Shakespeare play (see: Shakespearean comedies), and the film stars Al Pacino as Shylock and Jeremy Irons as Antonio. In 2007, he reunited Demi Moore and Michael Caine (who had already been together in 1984 for Blame it on Rio) in Flawless, a diamond heist story set in 1960. His most recent film is Elsa & Fred (2014), a romantic comedy starring Shirley MacLaine and Christopher Plummer.

Radford directed his first play in 2000, a West End production of The Seven Year Itch. This was an adaptation of Billy Wilder's 1955 film starring Marilyn Monroe.

Personal life
Radford has a son, Felix (born 1991), from his first marriage to Iseult Teran. He also has a daughter, Amaryllis (born 2005), and a son, Linus (born 2010), with his current wife Emma Tweed.

In addition to English (his first language), he speaks fluent Spanish, French, Italian, and some Mandarin.

In September 2013, he took part in the Clipper Round the World Sailing Race, in which he raced one of 12 identical 70-foot racing yachts from London to Rio.

Filmography

Awards and nominations

References

External links 
 

1946 births
Alumni of Worcester College, Oxford
Alumni of the National Film and Television School
Best Director BAFTA Award winners
Living people
English Jews
English film directors
English screenwriters
English male screenwriters
English-language film directors
English people of Austrian-Jewish descent
People from New Delhi
People educated at Bedford School
Filmmakers who won the Best Foreign Language Film BAFTA Award